Pretest is an album by progressive rock band Dysrhythmia. It is their third full-length overall and their first release on Relapse Records.

Track listing

Dysrhythmia (band) albums
2003 albums
Relapse Records albums